"Bette Davis Eyes" is a song written and composed by Donna Weiss and Jackie DeShannon in 1974. It was originally recorded by DeShannon in that year for her album New Arrangement but it was made popular by American singer Kim Carnes in 1981 when it spent nine non-consecutive weeks on top of the U.S. Billboard Hot 100. The song was #1 for five weeks, interrupted for just one week by "Stars on 45" before it returned to the top spot for another four weeks and became Billboard's biggest hit of the year. The single also reached No. 5 on Billboards Top Tracks charts and No. 26 on the Dance charts. It was also a No. 1 hit in 21 countries and peaked at No. 10 in the United Kingdom, to date her only Top 40 hit in that country. It also reached No. 2 in Canada for twelve consecutive weeks, and was the No. 2 hit of 1981 in that country after "Stars on 45".

The song won the Grammy Awards for Song of the Year and Record of the Year; it also ranked at No. 12 on Billboard's list of the Top 100 songs in the first 50 years of the Billboard Hot 100 chart.

Cleopatra Records released a re-recording of the song as a single in 2007.

This song is written in the key of F major.

Reception
Record World called it a "haunting pop-rocker" and said that Carnes' "earthy vocal rasp & guitar chimes are unforgettable."

Background

The song was written in 1974 by Donna Weiss and Jackie DeShannon, the latter of whom recorded the song that same year on her album New Arrangement. In this original incarnation, the track is performed in an 'R&B lite' arrangement, featuring a prominent uptempo piano part, as well as flourishes of pedal steel guitar and horns. However, it was not until March 1981, when Kim Carnes recorded her version of the song in a radically different synthesizer-based arrangement, that "Bette Davis Eyes" became a commercial success.

According to producer Val Garay, the original demo of the tune that was brought to him sounded like "a Leon Russell track, with this beer-barrel polka piano part." The demo can be heard in a Val Garay interview on TAXI TV at 21:50. Keyboardist Bill Cuomo came up with the signature synth riff, using the Sequential Circuits Prophet-5 synthesizer, which now defines Carnes's version. The song was recorded in the studio on the first take.

Actress Bette Davis was 73 years old when Kim Carnes's version became a hit. She wrote letters to Carnes, Weiss, and DeShannon to thank all three of them for making her "a part of modern times" and stated that her grandson now looked up to her. After their Grammy wins, Davis sent them roses as well.

Music video
The video was directed by Australian film director Russell Mulcahy.

Track listing and formats

7" single
"Bette Davis Eyes" – 3:45
"Miss You Tonite" – 5:11

US 12" maxi-single
"Bette Davis Eyes" – 3:45
"Miss You Tonite" – 5:11

Charts and certifications

Weekly charts

Year-end charts

All-time charts

Certifications

Gwyneth Paltrow version
American actress Gwyneth Paltrow covered "Bette Davis Eyes" included on the soundtrack to the 2000 road trip film Duets. It was released as a single in Australia on March 26, 2001, debuting and peaking at number three on the ARIA Singles Chart on April 8, 2001. It spent nine weeks in the top 10. Paltrow's cover ended 2001 at number 35 on Australia's year-end chart and earned a platinum certification from the Australian Recording Industry Association for shipments exceeding 70,000 units.

See also

List of number-one singles in Australia during the 1980s
List of Top 25 singles for 1981 in Australia
List of Billboard Hot 100 number-one singles of 1981
Billboard Year-End Hot 100 singles of 1981
List of Cash Box Top 100 number-one singles of 1981
List of number-one singles of 1981 (France)
List of number-one hits of 1981 (Germany)
List of number-one hits (Italy)
List of number-one songs in Norway
List of number-one singles of 1981 (Spain)
List of number-one singles of the 1980s (Switzerland)

References

1974 songs
1981 singles
Billboard Hot 100 number-one singles
Cashbox number-one singles
EMI America Records singles
Grammy Award for Record of the Year
Grammy Award for Song of the Year
Jackie DeShannon songs
Kim Carnes songs
Gwyneth Paltrow songs
Music videos directed by Russell Mulcahy
American new wave songs
Number-one singles in Australia
Number-one singles in Brazil
Number-one singles in Finland
Number-one singles in Germany
Number-one singles in France
Number-one singles in Italy
Number-one singles in Norway
Number-one singles in South Africa
Number-one singles in Spain
Number-one singles in Switzerland
Songs written by Jackie DeShannon
Songs written by Donna Weiss
Bette Davis
Songs about actors
Song recordings produced by Val Garay